Neka County is in Mazandaran province, Iran. The capital of the county is the city of Neka. At the 2006 census, the county's population was 104,753 in 26,723 households. The following census in 2011 counted 111,944 people in 32,613 households. At the 2016 census, the county's population was 119,511 in 38,178 households.

Administrative divisions

The population history of Neka County's administrative divisions over three consecutive censuses is shown in the following table. The latest census shows two districts, five rural districts, and one city.

References

 

Counties of Mazandaran Province